The 1950 Minnesota lieutenant gubernatorial election took place on November 7, 1950. Incumbent Lieutenant Governor C. Elmer Anderson defeated Minnesota Democratic-Farmer-Labor Party challenger Frank Murphy.

Results

External links
 Election Returns

Minnesota
Lieutenant Gubernatorial
1950